Jacquot de Nantes is a 1991 French drama film directed by Agnès Varda. It was screened out of competition at the 1991 Cannes Film Festival. 

The film is a portrait of the making of an artist; recreating the early life of Varda's husband, Jacques Demy, in Occupied France and his interest in the various crafts associated with film making, such as casting, set design, animation and lighting. The fictional sections set in wartime Nantes are matched with brief documentary interludes involving the dying Demy.

Cast
 Philippe Maron - Jacquot 1
 Edouard Joubeaud - Jacquot 2
 Laurent Monnier - Jacquot 3
 Brigitte De Villepoix - Marilou, la mere
 Daniel Dublet - Raymond, le pere
 Clément Delaroche - Yvon 1
 Rody Averty - Yvon 2
 Hélène Pors - Reine 1
 Marie-Sidonie Benoist - Reine 2
 Jérémie Bernard - Yannick 1
 Cédric Michaud - Yannick 2
 Julien Mitard - Rene 1
 Jérémie Bader - Rene 2
 Guillaume Navaud - Cousin Joel
 Fanny Lebreton - La petite refugee

References

External links

1991 films
Films set in Nantes
1990s French-language films
1991 drama films
Films directed by Agnès Varda
Films about filmmaking
French drama films
1990s French films